The Sun Yun-suan Memorial Museum is a museum in Zhongzheng District, Taipei, Taiwan about former Premier Sun Yun-suan.

History
The museum building was formerly the residence for Premier Sun Yun-suan in 1980 until his death in 2006. The building was then designated as historical monument by Taipei City Government in the same year. It was opened to the public on 30 October 2014.

Architecture
The museum building consists of front garden with pond.

Exhibitions
The museum displays permanent exhibitions of his and his wife handwritten diaries, manuscripts, photographs and personal items. There are also contemporary exhibitions displayed at the building as well.

Transportation
The museum is accessible within walking distance south of Xiaonanmen Station of Taipei Metro.

See also
 List of museums in Taiwan

References

External links
 

2014 establishments in Taiwan
Biographical museums in Taiwan
Houses in Taiwan
Museums established in 2014
Museums in Taipei